Golden Spike National Historical Park is a United States National Historical Park located at Promontory Summit, north of the Great Salt Lake in east-central Box Elder County, Utah, United States.

It commemorates the completion of the first Transcontinental Railroad where the Central Pacific Railroad and the first Union Pacific Railroad met on May 10, 1869. The final joining of the rails spanning the continent was signified by the driving of the ceremonial Golden Spike.

Background

The Golden Spike National Historical Park encompasses . It reached its present size in 1980. In addition to the Summit site where the rails were joined, the Park includes the two linear areas known as the west slope (west of the junction) and the east slope (east of the junction), which include worker campsites, partially-completed grades, incomplete cuts, specialty workshops, and two historical landmarks: where the Central Pacific finished its "Ten miles of track, laid in one day" tracklaying record (west slope) and where the Big Fill and Big Trestle were completed (east slope).

Although the line was abandoned in 1904 (bypassed by the Lucin Cutoff) and the original rails were removed in 1942 to serve the war effort, the site presently includes  of rebuilt track from the summit area (where the rail systems were joined) to a train storage building. The rebuilt track was designed to be an authentic representation of the 1869 rails.

In 2002, it received 49,950 visitors.  annual visitation ranges from 48,000 to 64,000.

History
The first monument erected at the site was a concrete obelisk built by the Southern Pacific Railroad (successor to the Central Pacific) . It has since been moved several times, but can presently be seen near the 1969 Visitor's Center.

Bernice Gibbs Anderson founded and led the movement to have the site preserved as a memorial to the First Transcontinental Railroad, starting with articles about local history that began in 1926. Anderson was president of the Golden Spike Association of Box Elder County, which held its first re-enactment of the joining of the rails on May 10, 1952, using local volunteers organized by Judge B.C. Call from a script written by Marie Thorne Jepson. Anderson tirelessly wrote to state and federal officials urging them to build a monument at Promontory Summit, and it was authorized as a National Historic Site on April 2, 1957, under non-federal ownership; at that time, the Golden Spike Association maintained the site under a cooperative agreement between the Southern Pacific Railroad and the state and federal governments.

It was authorized for federal ownership and administration by an act of Congress on July 30, 1965, as Golden Spike National Historic Site. The John D. Dingell, Jr. Conservation, Management, and Recreation Act, signed into law March 12, 2019, redesignated it as a national historical park. Historic sites are typically a single building, while historical parks include multiple landmarks in a larger district.

28,000 visitors attended the centennial anniversary of the completion ceremony on May 10, 1969, including Bernice Gibbs Anderson. The  Visitor's Center had just been completed. On that day, the locomotives Genoa and Inyo were loaned from the Virginia and Truckee Railroad to recreate the completion ceremony. That year, the railroad grade was named a National Historic Civil Engineering Landmark.

In 1978, a general master plan for the site was adopted with the goal of maintaining the site's scenic attributes as closely as possible to its appearance and characteristics in 1869. The functioning replicas of the Jupiter and No. 119 locomotives were brought to the site in time to celebrate the 110th anniversary of the joining of the rails in 1979.

In 2006, a petition to the Board on Geographic Names resulted in a name change for Chinaman's Arch, a  limestone arch at Golden Spike National Historical Park. Named Chinaman's Arch in honor of the 19th century Chinese railroad workers, the arch was officially renamed in the same year as the Chinese Arch to mollify sensitivities about the original name.

On May 10, 2019, a 150th anniversary celebration was held in commemoration of the completion of the railroad. This event was attended by several notable local leaders, including Utah governor Gary Herbert and the president of the Church of Jesus Christ of Latter-day Saints, Russell M. Nelson.

Gallery

See also

 National Register of Historic Places listings in Box Elder County, Utah
 Jupiter (locomotive)
 Union Pacific No. 119
 List of heritage railroads in the United States
 List of transport museums
 Promontory, Utah
 Northern Pacific Railway Completion Site, 1883

References

External links

 
 
 
 ThemeTrains.com - The Golden Spike Centennial Limited
 
 
 

Rail transportation on the National Register of Historic Places in Utah
National Register of Historic Places in Box Elder County, Utah
National Historic Sites in Utah
Railroad museums in Utah
Museums in Box Elder County, Utah
History museums in Utah
Protected areas of Box Elder County, Utah
Historic American Buildings Survey in Utah
Historic American Engineering Record in Utah
Protected areas established in 1957
1957 establishments in Utah
National Historical Parks of the United States
First transcontinental railroad
Historic Civil Engineering Landmarks
Transportation in Box Elder County, Utah